Křišťanovice is a municipality and village in Bruntál District in the Moravian-Silesian Region of the Czech Republic. It has about 200 inhabitants.

Gallery

References

Villages in Bruntál District